Swainsboro High School is a public high school located in Swainsboro, Georgia, United States. The school is part of the Emanuel County School District, which serves Emanuel County.

References

External links
Swainsboro High School
Emanuel County School District

Public high schools in Georgia (U.S. state)
Schools accredited by the Southern Association of Colleges and Schools
Georgia Accrediting Commission
Schools in Emanuel County, Georgia